L. Herbert Jones (May 23, 1904 – May 28, 1926) was an American racecar driver from Indianapolis.

Jones drove in the 1925 Indianapolis 500, one of only 25 drivers in the field, but crashed on lap 69 and finished 19th.

In 1926 Jones attempted to return to the race.  However, he clipped the inside wall at the northwest turn on his second qualifying lap on May 27, flipping the car several times and fracturing his skull.  He died of his injuries the following day.

Indianapolis 500 results

See also
List of fatalities at the Indianapolis Motor Speedway

References

1904 births
1926 deaths
Racing drivers from Indianapolis
Indianapolis 500 drivers
AAA Championship Car drivers
Racing drivers who died while racing
Sports deaths in Indiana